Drinker or The Drinker may refer to:

Art and literature
 The Drinker (Banksy), a 2004 statue
 The Drinker (novel), a 1950 novel by Hans Fallada
 The Drinkers, or The Triumph of Bacchus, a 1628 painting by Diego Velázquez

Biology
 Drinker nisti, a genus of hypsilophodont dinosaur from the late Jurassic period of North America
 Drinker (moth) (Euthrix potatoria), a moth species in family Lasiocampidae

Other uses
 Drinker (surname), a surname
 Drinker House, a building used for student housing at Haverford College, named after Henry Drinker
 Drinker, one who consumes alcoholic beverages